Parit Wacharasindhu (born: 10 December 1992) a Thai politician, usually known by his nickname Itim (ไอติม).

Early life and education
Parit was born into a prominent Thai family. Both his parents are doctors and his mother, Prof. Dr. Alisa Wacharasindhu (née Vejjajiva), is also the eldest sister of former prime minister, Abhisit Vejjajiva and former Democrat Party leader.

Parit graduated from Chulalongkorn University Demonstration Elementary School. When he was nine years old, he travelled to study in England at preparatory schools and Eton College (including Shrewsbury International School in Thailand). He received a Bachelor's degree in Philosophy, Politics and Economics (PPE), from St John's College, University of Oxford like his uncle Abhisit Vejjajiva. 

During his studies at the Oxford in 2014, he was elected President of the Oxford Union, the largest student society at Oxford University, and one of the oldest debating societies in the world. He was the first Thai to take this role.

He is widely known in Thai society from being a trainee at the Office of the Prime Minister in 2009 while Abhisit Vejjajiva was Prime Minister.

Early career
After graduating from Oxford, Parit wanted to work in Thai politics. However, the country was still under military rule and there were no planned elections. Instead, he became a consultant for the firm McKinsey, working on various projects in Southeast Asia.

Political career
In 2018, Parit left his job at McKinsey and returned to Thailand to start his career in Thai politics. He joined the Democrat Party and affirmed his desire to run for office to become a member of the House of Representatives.

While waiting for the military junta to declare elections, Parit hosted and co-produced a TV program "Hen Kub Ta" (เห็นกับตา; lit: "see with eyes") on PPTV HD, starting 4 May 2018. The show consisted of him trying out different jobs (such as garbage collector) in each episode.

He also co-founded the "New Dem" group within the Democrat Party, with the goals of ushering in a new generation of Democrat politicians.

On 26 December 2018, he was assigned to be a candidate in Bangkok's 13th constituency, consisting of Bang Kapi and Wang Thonglang (only Phlapphla) in the 2019 general election. The seat was previously held by Nat Bantadtan (son of previous Democrat leader, Banyat Bantadtan) and is considered a strong Democrat constituency. Generally, first-time candidates like Parit are not assigned to run in safe seats as these seats are reserved for incumbents or more senior party members.

However, the Democrat Party faced a devastating defeat in the 2019 election, losing all its seats in Bangkok, which is traditionally a Democrat stronghold. Parit, who ran in Bangkok's 13th constituency, came in 4th place.

Post 2019 election
After news reports that senior members of the party planned to form a coalition government with Palang Pracharath, a pro-junta party, Parit and his New Dem colleagues came out against this move, citing the party's campaign promise that it won't back Gen. Prayut and support the junta's continuation of power. Instead, Parit urged the party to organise an open primary where the party's members and non-members could vote on the party's future. However, the Democrat party eventually joined Palang Pracharath's coalition, and Parit soon left the party.

In 2022, Parit joined the Move Forward Party, one of the leading opposition parties in the National Assembly. Since then, he became the party's policy campaign manager. He stated that he will not return to the Democrat Party.

Personal life
Parit is known for his relationship with the Channel 3's actress Nuttanicha "Nychaa" Dungwattanawanich. They were together for three years before separating in 2017.

References

Parit Wacharasindhu
Alumni of St John's College, Oxford
People educated at Eton College
Presidents of the Oxford Union
1992 births
Living people
Parit Wacharasindhu
Parit Wacharasindhu
Thai television personalities
Parit Wacharasindhu